María Alexandra Escobar Guerrero (born July 17, 1980) is an Ecuadorian weightlifter.

At the 2001 World Weightlifting Championships in Antalya, Turkey she won gold in the 53 kg category in the clean and jerk, bronze in the snatch, and the overall bronze medal with in total 205 kg.

She ranked 7th in the Woman's 58 kg category at the 2004 Summer Olympics, lifting 215 kg in total.

At the 2006 World Weightlifting Championships she ranked 16th in the 58 kg category, and at the 2007 World Weightlifting Championships she ranked 5th in the same category, lifting a total of 220 kg.

Escobar won the gold medal in the 58 kg category at the 2008 Pan American Weightlifting Championships.

She competed in Weightlifting at the 2008 Summer Olympics – Women's 58 kg in Beijing, ranking 5th with 223 kg in total, and also was the national flag bearer at the opening ceremony.  She was the Ecuadorian flag-bearer for both the 2004 and 2008 Olympic games.

At the 2012 Summer Olympics, she again competed in the women's 58 kg category, finishing 9th with a total of 226 kg.

Early life
Escobar's parents struggled to support her, and soon sent her to be raised by her aunt Luisa Marquez. It was Luisa's daughter, Adela Marquez, who introduced Escobar to the sport of weightlifting.  From an early age Escobar knew that sports would likely present the best opportunity to escape the poverty she had inherited at birth.

Escobar was found by a local coach in Esmeraldas named Silvio Mila. Mila practically refused to let Escobar walk away from the sport, and just four months after beginning to train in the sport she won her first medal and was shortly thereafter invited to join the Ecuadorian Weightlifting team. Escobar first found international success in 2001 at the World Championships in Antalya, Turkey where she won a gold medal in the 53 kg Clean & Jerk event. Escobar has also found considerable success on her home continent winning 18 gold medals in various major South American competitions. She has competed in three Olympic Games all in the 58 kg event, and is currently working towards qualifying for the 2016 games to be held in Rio de Janeiro, Brazil. Escobar and her husband Dario Xavier Garcia have one son, Dominic Ramses Garcia. She is currently coached by the Cuban Javier Perez Rosas, and trains in her home town of Esmeraldas. The government has provided her with facilities to train in and a monthly stipend to allow her to focus solely on weightlifting.

Pan American Championships

While Alexandra Escobar has competed in three Olympic Games and several World Championships her greatest success has undoubtedly come at the Pan American Championships. She first appeared on the Pan American stage in 2008 at the games held in Callao, Peru when she swept the 58 kg events, winning three gold medals 1 each in the 58 kg, the 58 kg – snatch, and the 58 kg – clean & jerk. Since the 2008 games in Callao Escobar has won 10 gold medals, 2 silvers, and 1 bronze. Making that even more impressive, she won back to back to back gold medals in both the 58 kg and the 58 kg – clean & jerk during the 2008, 2009 and 2010 games. Escobar is showing no signs of slowing down either having recently won gold medals in 58 kg, the 58 kg – snatch and the 58 kg – clean & jerk events at the 2013 games held in Caracas, Venezuela.

Olympic Games

Alexandra Escobar's dream is to win an Olympic medal, and she has competed in five games so far. She first competed in the Olympics in 2004 in Athens, Greece. She then returned in the 2008 games in Beijing, China. Finally, she competed in London, England during the 2012 games. Prior to the 2012 games, Escobar said:

Escobar has yet to accomplish this goal as her best finish so far was fourth place in the 2008 games. In the opening ceremony of those games, Escobar was the flag bearer for her home country Ecuador. Escobar considers this a great honor that was bestowed upon her. Her other finishes in the Olympics were 7th place in 2004 and 9th in 2012. After the disappointing finish in London, there was some speculation that Escobar would retire as she has spoken about an interest in coaching and studying sports science. However this soon proved false as she has returned to competitions in 2013.

World Championships

Alexandra Escobar has competed in eight World Championships. She has won one gold medal, in 2001, and has finished second on two occasions, both occurring in the 2013 games held in Wroclaw, Poland. She has also won four bronze medals, in 2001, 2003 and 2013. Her medals have all came in the 58 kg, 58 kg – snatch and 58 kg – clean & jerk events.

Controversy

In October 2003, Escobar threatened to boycott the World Championships that were being held in Vancouver, Canada later that year unless the governing committee canceled a twenty thousand dollar fine that was imposed on a fellow competitor. Ultimately, the issue was resolved and Escobar attended the games winning a bronze medal in the 58 kg – snatch event. This event painted Escobar as a martyr in the eyes of the weightlifting community and garnered her significant respect among her fellow competitors.

Major Results

References

External links
 
 

1980 births
Living people
World Weightlifting Championships medalists
Olympic weightlifters of Ecuador
Weightlifters at the 2004 Summer Olympics
Weightlifters at the 2008 Summer Olympics
Weightlifters at the 2012 Summer Olympics
Weightlifters at the 2016 Summer Olympics
Weightlifters at the 2007 Pan American Games
Sportspeople from Esmeraldas, Ecuador
Ecuadorian female weightlifters
Pan American Games gold medalists for Ecuador
Pan American Games medalists in weightlifting
Weightlifters at the 2015 Pan American Games
South American Games gold medalists for Ecuador
South American Games medalists in weightlifting
Competitors at the 2010 South American Games
Weightlifters at the 2019 Pan American Games
Medalists at the 2007 Pan American Games
Medalists at the 2019 Pan American Games
Medalists at the 2011 Pan American Games
Weightlifters at the 2020 Summer Olympics
21st-century Ecuadorian women
20th-century Ecuadorian women